Lai-Hka (ဝဵင်းလၢႆးၶႃႈ) is a town of Lai-Hka District in the Shan State of Myanmar. It is the capital of Lai-Hka Township.

သမိုင်း
 Lai-Hka (ဝဵင်းလၢႆးၶႃႈ) သည် ယခင်က ရှမ်းပြည်တောင်ပိုင်းမှ တစ်ခုဖြစ်သည့် Legya ပြည်နယ်၏ မြို့တော်ဖြစ်သည်။  Kesee နှင့် Nam Zang အရှေ့ဘက်နယ်စပ်ရှိ ပင်လယ်ရေပြင်အထက် 3,116 ပေ ရှိသည်။  တောင်ဘက်တွင် ပင်လုံနှင့် လွိုင်လင်မြို့တို့ကို ဆက်သွယ်ထားသည်။  အနောက်ဘက်တွင်၊ ၎င်း၏အိမ်နီးချင်းမြို့သည်မြောက်ဘက်တွင် Lokjok နှင့် Merng Klueng ဖြစ်သည်။  Lai-Hka မြို့နယ်၏ စုစုပေါင်း ဧရိယာသည် ၉၁၄.၉၂ စတုရန်းမိုင် ရှိပြီး အပိုင်း ၇ ပိုင်း ပိုင်းခြားထားသည်။  မြို့နယ်၏ကျေးလက်အပိုင်းကို လေးပုံတစ်ပုံခွဲ ခွဲထားသည်။  ကျေးရွာစုစုပေါင်း ၁၈၀ ရှိပြီး တစ်မြို့လုံး လူဦးရေ ၅၅၀၀၀ ကျော်ရှိသည်။  စိုက်ပျိုးရေးသည် Lai-Hka တွင် အဓိကလုပ်ငန်းဖြစ်သည်။

References

Populated places in Shan State
Loilen District